AAPL may refer to:

 NASDAQ ticker symbol for Apple Inc.
 American Association of Professional Landmen
 American Academy of Psychiatry and the Law